Bramham cum Oglethorpe is a civil parish forming part of the City of Leeds in the English county of West Yorkshire.

The main settlement in the parish is Bramham. It was a township and became a civil parish in 1866. According to the 2001 census the parish had a population of 1,715, which had fallen to 1,650 by the time of the 2011 census.

See also
Listed buildings in Bramham cum Oglethorpe

References 

Civil parishes in West Yorkshire
Places in Leeds